The Bristol State Liners are a collegiate summer baseball team based in Bristol, Virginia. It is a member of the Appalachian League, a collegiate summer league that operates in the Appalachian regions of Tennessee, Virginia, West Virginia, and North Carolina. The team is operated by a non-profit organization, Bristol Baseball, Incorporated (BBI).  BBI had no full-time paid staff, instead relying on a volunteer board and general manager to keep and promote professional baseball in Bristol.

Professional team 
The original team played in the Appalachian League from 1921 to 1925. Since 1969 the franchise has been operated Bristol Baseball, Incorporated (BBI). The organization was affiliated with the Pittsburgh Pirates, Chicago White Sox and Detroit Tigers.

Collegiate summer team 
In conjunction with a contraction of Minor League Baseball beginning with the 2021 season, the Appalachian League was reorganized as a collegiate summer baseball league, and the Bristol Pirates were replaced by a new franchise in the revamped league designed for rising college freshmen and sophomores. On February 2, 2021 Bristol Baseball, Incorporated (BBI) revived the name Bristol State Liners. The nickname references the fact that the twin cities of Bristol, Virginia and Bristol, Tennessee are adjacent to one another, with the state line between the two running right down the center of State Street, their shared major downtown thoroughfare.

References

External links
 

2021 establishments in Virginia
Amateur baseball teams in Virginia
Appalachian League teams
Baseball teams established in 2021
Bristol, Virginia